Ali El Ghrari (born 31 January 1997) is a male Libyan recurve archer. He competed in the archery competition at the 2016 Summer Olympics in Rio de Janeiro, the first Libyan to do so.

References

External links
 
 

Libyan male archers
Living people
1997 births
Archers at the 2016 Summer Olympics
Olympic archers of Libya
Archers at the 2014 Summer Youth Olympics